"The Elvis Medley" is an Elvis Presley medley arranged and produced by David Briggs. The track opened the eponymous LP released in 1982.

Released as a single, with "Always on My Mind" on the  B-side, the medley reached number 71 on the Billboard Hot 100.

Track listing 
7" single (RCA PB-13351, 1982)
 Side A. "The Elvis Medley" – 3:54
 "Jailhouse Rock" 
 "(Let Me Be Your) Teddy Bear" 
 "Hound Dog" 
 "Don't Be Cruel (to a Heart That's True)" 
 "Burning Love" 
 "Suspicious Minds" 
 Side B. "Always on My Mind"  – 3:36

Charts

References

External links 
 

1982 songs
1982 singles
Elvis Presley songs